That Was Then is an American drama television series that was broadcast on ABC September 27 to October 4, 2002. It was cancelled after only two episodes had aired.

Synopsis
The series starred James Bulliard as Travis Glass, a 30-year-old who finds his life in a rut. Still living at home with his mother (Bess Armstrong) he works as a door-to-door salesman. The girl of his dreams, played by Kiele Sanchez, is married to his older brother, Gregg, played by Brad Raider. Travis is able to trace his life's downward spiral to a single week in high school in 1988. After telling his best friend, played by Tyler Labine, that he wished for a second chance to make everything right, he lies in bed listening to the song "Do It Again" by The Kinks, when a bolt of lightning hits his house, and an electrical jolt sends him back to that week in 1988. Glass tries to correct things that originally went wrong, but finds his new life isn't quite to his expectations, and must return from the past.

It was compared to The WB series with a similar premise, Do Over.

Cast
 James Bulliard as Travis Glass
 Bess Armstrong as Mickey Glass
 Brad Raider as Gregg "Quad G" Glass
 Kiele Sanchez as Claudia Wills
 Tyler Labine as Donnie Pinkus
 Tricia O'Kelley as Sophie Frisch
 Andrea Bowen as Zooey
 Logan O'Brien as Ethan Glass
 Jeffrey Tambor as Gary "Double G" Glass

Episodes

External links
 
 

2002 American television series debuts
2002 American television series endings
2000s American drama television series
2000s American time travel television series
American Broadcasting Company original programming
English-language television shows
Television series by ABC Studios
American time travel television series